Gudivada revenue division (or Gudivada division) is an administrative division in the Krishna district of the Indian state of Andhra Pradesh. It is one of the 3 revenue divisions in the district with 7 mandals under its administration. Gudivada serves as the headquarters of the division. The division has only one municipality.

Mandals 
The mandals in the division are Gudivada, Gudlavalleru, Nandivada, Pedaparupudi, Gannavaram, Bapulapadu and Unguturu.

Administration 
The present Revenue Divisional Officer of Gudivada revenue division is Padmavati.

See also 
List of revenue divisions in Andhra Pradesh

References 

Revenue divisions in Krishna district